Soodabeh Davaran is an Iranian rearcher, and professor of polymer chemistry in the Faculty of Pharmacy in Tabriz University of Medical Sciences.
She has written many articles about chemistry.

Awards 
Awards include:
Davaran has gained First Rank of 9th Razi festival in Pharmacy (Basic Sciences Research), 2003; December, Tehran-Iran.
She has been selected among the Women Elites of Iran and All Elites around the Islamic World, 2007: July, Tehran- Iran.
She has been selected to be included in the first edition of "Who's Who in Plastics and Polymers", James P Harrington, Editor in chief, Society of Plastic Engineers, Technomic Publishing Company Inc, Lancaster, Pennsylvania, US
Also she has been selected amongst best researchers of Research Centers of Tabriz University of Medical Sciences, December 2003 and of Drug Applied Research Center of Tabriz University of Medical Sciences, 2004 December, Tabriz Iran and selected lecturer of Tabriz University of Medical Science, 2007, Tabriz, Iran.

References

Official Website 
www.profdavaran.com

People from Tabriz
Living people
Iranian chemists
Tabriz University of Medical Sciences alumni
Academic staff of Tabriz University of Medical Sciences
Year of birth missing (living people)
Iranian women chemists